Fåvang is a village in Ringebu Municipality in Innlandet county, Norway. The European route E6 highway runs through the village, right along the river.

History 
Fåvang Stave Church (Fåvang kirke) was built after the Reformation, for the most part of using materials from earlier stave churches in the valley which had been demolished.  The church was probably built between 1627 and 1630. The oldest parts can be dated back to around 1150–1250.

Particularly heavy fighting took place in Fåvang, as well as neighboring Tretten, Vinstra, Kvam, Sjoa and Otta during the Norwegian Campaign which led up to the occupation of Norway by Nazi Germany. The Norwegian movie Jonny Vang was principally filmed in the town of Fåvang during 2003.

Name
The village (and church parish) is named after the old Fåvang farm since the first Fåvang Church was built there. The first element is the river name Få (see also Fådalen and the old name of Lysakerelva) and the last element is vangr which means 'meadow'.

Notable residents 
 Finn Kalvik, artist

References

Ringebu
Villages in Innlandet
Populated places on the Gudbrandsdalslågen